Brian Hebditch (born 15 July 1948) is a British sports shooter. He competed in the mixed skeet event at the 1976 Summer Olympics.

References

1948 births
Living people
British male sport shooters
Olympic shooters of Great Britain
Shooters at the 1976 Summer Olympics
Sportspeople from Cheltenham
20th-century British people